The National Appliance Energy Conservation Act of 1987 (NAECA) is a United States Act of Congress that regulates energy consumption of specific household appliances. Though minimum Energy Efficiency Standards were first established by the United States Congress in Part B of Title III of the Energy Policy and Conservation Act (EPCA), those standards were then amended by the National Appliance Energy Conservation Act of 1987, the Energy Policy Act of 1992 and the Energy Policy Act of 2005.

All of these laws and regulations have to do with creating mandatory standards that deal with the energy efficiency of certain household appliances.  These standards were put in place to ensure that manufacturers were building products that are at the maximum energy efficiency levels are that are technically feasible and economically justified.

History

The National Appliance Energy Conservation Act of 1975 (NAECA) was enacted to help create uniform appliance efficiency standards at a time when individual states were creating their own standards. The NAECA established a conservation program for major household appliances, however no real standards came into existence until the 1980s when appliance manufacturers realized it was easier to conform to a uniform federal standard then individual state standards.

The National Appliance Energy Conservation Act of 1987 amended the Energy Policy and Conservation Act and was introduced and supported by democratic Senator Bennett Johnston, Jr. from Louisiana in January 1987. The new amendments to the act established minimum efficiency standards for many household appliances, including:
Refrigerators
Refrigerator-Freezers
Freezers
Room Air Conditioner
Fluorescent Lamp Ballasts
Incandescent Reflector Lamps
Clothes Dryers
Clothes Washers
Dishwashers
Kitchen Ranges and Ovens
Pool Heaters
Television Sets (withdrawn in 1995)
Water Heaters

Congress set the initial efficiency standards at the start of the act then set a schedule for the United States Department of Energy to review them. The act also put into place laws prohibiting manufacturers from making any representations about the energy efficiency of any product on this list without first being tested by Federal testing procedure, and disclosing the results of such tests. Lastly the new act set new rules for when state regulations will be superseded by federal regulations in regard to testing and labeling requirements, and energy conservation standards.

References

1987 in law
1987 in the environment
100th United States Congress
United States federal energy legislation